is a Japanese female singer and actress, who was famous in 1970s' Japan. On October 1, 1971, she debuted with the single "Mizuiro no Koi." She was born as Mari Saito in Omiya, Saitama Prefecture. She got five Oricon No.1 songs, a record as a female singer which was later broken by Seiko Matsuda. She started the era of Japanese idols in the 1970s and 1980s. Mari Amachi was the top female vocalist of Sony Music Entertainment in Japan.

Biography 

While Amachi was still in elementary school, her mother taught her how to play the piano. In 1964 she attended Junior High School attached to Kunitachi College of  Music located in Kunitachi, Tokyo, where she studied piano and vocals. She graduated from High School attached to the college mentioned above in March 1970.

Mari Amachi debuted in October 1971 with the single "Mizuiro No Koi". She was promoted alongside Rumiko Koyanagi and Saori Minami, and they were dubbed the "San-Nin Musume" (Three young girls). Before them, Hibari Misora, Chiemi Eri and Izumi Yukimura were promoted in the same fashion. In 1973, Amachi, Koyanagi and Minami were followed by Momoe Yamaguchi, Junko Sakurada and Masako Mori, who were known as "Hana No Chu 3 Trio" (The Trio of Third-Year Junior High School Students).

Mari Amachi proved to be a huge success in Japan. She was one of the first Japanese singers to be deemed an "idol". Her single "Chiisana Koi" was the first of five number 1 hits on the Oricon chart list. No other female Japanese entertainer had achieved this, yet her record was broken by Pink Lady in the late 70s and their record was subsequently broken by Seiko Matsuda in the 80s. At the 15th Japan Record Awards the single Wakaba No Sasayaki won the award for best musical arrangement of the year, and at the 6th Japan Record Sales Award the song was awarded with a gold medal. She was the second best selling Japanese artist in 1972 and 1973.

By the summer of 1972, her single "Hitori Janai No" had sold over 600,000 copies and proved to be her second #1, and she was invited to perform on the 23d edition of Kōhaku Uta Gassen. That same year Mari Amachi starred in her own television series, "The Mari Amachi Show", which was aired by TBS from 1972 up to 1975. The following year, Mari Amachi and fellow idol Hiromi Go were reported to be responsible for grossing more than $45 million for Sony Music Entertainment. She was dubbed "Sony's Snow White".

Mari Amachi also performed on the 24th edition of Kōhaku Uta Gassen, as well as the 25th.

Apart from being a singer, Mari Amachi was also an actress.

In 1977 Mari Amachi withdrew from public life citing thyroid problems, although she later admitted she was suffering from a depression. In 1979 she returned to showbusiness, and was welcomed back with a large press party at CBS Sony's recording studio. Her record sales declined sharply, and she released her last single in 1983.

By the end of 2015, Mari Amachi was reported to live in a retirement home. At present of 2021, she is active in the Fan Club.

Discography

Top 10 singles

Top 10 Albums

Kōhaku Uta Gassen appearances

References

External links 
 

1951 births
Living people
Japanese women singers
Japanese idols
People from Saitama (city)
Japanese actresses
Japanese women musicians
Musicians from Saitama Prefecture